The Two Georges is an alternate history and detective thriller novel co-written by science fiction author Harry Turtledove and Oscar-winning actor Richard Dreyfuss. It was originally published in 1995 by Hodder & Stoughton in the United Kingdom, and in 1996 by Tor Books in the United States, and was nominated for the 1995 Sidewise Award for Alternate History.

Background

For more than two centuries, what would have become the continental United States and Canada has been the North American Union, a self-governing dominion within the British Empire with Alaska being retained under the rule of Russia and Hawaii being a British protectorate. The title of the novel refers to a fictional Gainsborough painting that commemorates the agreement between George Washington and King George III, which peacefully ended the American Revolution, implied as the result of George Grenville never becoming Prime Minister. The painting itself has become a symbol of national unity.

Native Americans fared much better than in real-world history with tribes such as the Iroquois and the Cherokee managing to keep much of their land and have autonomy, their status comparable to that of the Princely States in British India.

As the North American Union remained in the British Empire following peaceful negotiation, the French Revolution was suppressed at the storming of the Bastille by troops under the command of Napoleon Bonaparte in the service of Louis XVI, thus preserving the Bourbon monarchy. By the twentieth century, France and Spain exist in a French-dominated personal union, the Holy Alliance, which controls most of Latin America and Northern Africa and is ruled over by François IV.

The abolition of slavery in the British Empire in 1833 included slaves in North America. The emancipated blacks prospered, gained education and experienced a rapid upward social mobility, by the twentieth century, becoming a mainly middle class community. Conversely, the Irish-American community remained a predominantly poor, working class population, subsisting on hard physical labor such as the coal mining on which the North American Union depended for its energy. This created a feeling of bitter jealousy among the Irish, and many of them came to support the Sons of Liberty, a terrorist organization that wants to see America become independent from the British Empire and promotes a blatantly racist and xenophobic ideology.

In the twentieth century, the empires of Great Britain, the Holy Alliance and Russia are the world's major powers, with the Austrian Empire being a European land-based middle power coveting Balkan territory and neither Germany nor Italy becoming unified nation-states.

As in the Mexican War of our history, the mid-nineteenth century saw Britain and the North American Union conquer a large portion of Nueva España (in this case, also including the Baja California peninsula) from the Holy Alliance. The city of Los Angeles was renamed New Liverpool and developed into one of the largest cities of the North American Union and the Province of Upper California.

Plot
The Two Georges, being displayed in New Liverpool, is stolen while a crowd is distracted by the murder of 'Honest' Dick (a.k.a. 'Tricky' Dick), the Steamer King, a nationally known used car salesman. In its place is left a gramophone with a recording of the "Yankee Doodle," a notorious subversive song serving as the anthem of the Sons of Liberty.

Colonel Thomas Bushell of the Royal American Mounted Police leads the search for the painting, accompanied by its former curator (and his eventual love interest) Dr. Kathleen Flannery and Captain Samuel Stanley. Some days later, a ransom note is received from the Sons of Liberty. The Governor-General of the North American Union, Sir Martin Luther King, informs Bushell in confidence that the painting must be recovered before King-Emperor Charles III's state visit, or the government will have to pay the Sons' ransom demand of fifty million pounds.

The search takes Bushell, Flannery, and Stanley across the country via airship (an advanced form of dirigible), train, and steamer. They also meet many members of the Sons of Liberty, including Common Sense editor John F. Kennedy.

After chasing many false leads and the wrong suspects, Bushell and his associates arrive at Victoria (the nation's capital, on the south side of the Potomac River across from Georgestown, Maryland); during a reception at the Russian Embassy, Bushell encounters his ex-wife Irene, who had an affair with and subsequently married Sir David Clarke, Governor-General King's chief of staff. The Two Georges is found undamaged in a self-storage facility an hour before the King arrives. They also uncover the true culprits: the Holy Alliance and Bushell's superior officer and covert Sons of Liberty operative, Lieutenant General Sir Horace Bragg, who believed that emancipation was an injustice to his formerly slavocratic family. Bushell then thwarts Bragg's attempts to assassinate the King, first by gunfire then by a bomb concealed in the frame of The Two Georges. When Bragg is arrested and awaiting trial, he and Bushell argue over the outcomes of a potential war against the Holy Alliance and a resultant American separatist uprising caused by the theft of the painting. Later, Bushell and Stanley are both knighted by King Charles for their accomplishments.

Reception
The Houston Chronicle listed The Two Georges as one of many pieces of fiction that have pictured blacks as the head of the executive branch, in this case Sir Martin Luther King, Governor General of North America. Publishers Weekly praises the novel's "recognizable yet delightfully distorted" world where "engaging characters play out a suspenseful and satisfying story". School Library Journal described the novel as "a fast-paced and gripping story."

Similar themes in other works

Washington's Dirigible, part of John Barnes' Timeline Wars series, has a similar theme: a resourceful time traveler manages to get Benjamin Franklin appointed as the tutor of the young George III – making him a liberal-minded King, well-disposed towards the North American colonists. The result, as in The Two Georges, is an alternate history timeline in which the American War of Independence is averted and North America remains part of the British Empire, although with a great deal of autonomy.

References

1996 American novels
Collaborative novels
Novels by Harry Turtledove
Political thriller novels
1995 science fiction novels
American alternate history novels
American science fiction novels
Hodder & Stoughton books
American political novels
American detective novels
American thriller novels
Novels set in Washington, D.C.
Novels set in Maryland
Novels set in Los Angeles
Cultural depictions of Martin Luther King Jr.
Cultural depictions of John F. Kennedy
Cultural depictions of Richard Nixon
British Empire in fiction
Novels set in North America
Novels set in fictional countries
Fiction set in 1995